Sir Thomas Andrew Alexander Montgomery-Cuninghame, 10th Baronet DSO (30 March 1877 – 5 January 1945) was a British Army officer and Distinguished Service Order recipient.

Family life
Montgomery-Cuninghame was born on 30 March 1877 in London, the 6th child and eldest son of  Elizabeth Hartopp, daughter and youngest child of Edward Bourchier Hartopp. His father was Sir William Montgomery-Cuninghame, 9th Baronet  V.C.

He was educated at Sandroyd School, Eton College (where he served with the Eton Volunteers) and then entered Sandhurst  although he had not expected to pass the entrance exams.

On the death of his father in 1897, he became the 10th Baronet of Corsehill.

His eldest sister, Edith Honoria, married Sir John Tilley in 1901.

On 1 November 1904, he married Alice Frances Denison Des Vœux daughter of Sir William Des Vœux  former governor of  Hong Kong, and Marion Denison née Pender, at St. Peter's Church, Eaton Square, London. They had two children, a son and a daughter. His daughter Pamela Richenda Cubitt would run a plant nursery and be a noted florist. They divorced in 1925 and his former wife remarried Sir Aubrey Symonds. His oldest child and heir to the baronetcy, Alexander William Henry James Montgomery-Cuninghame, a lieutenant colonel in the Royal Scots Fusiliers, and also a DSO recipient, died in World War II in France. He then married Nancy Macaulay Foggo of British Columbia on 24 November 1925 in London, daughter of William Stewart Foggo and Flora Alexandra née Macaulay, with whom he had two more sons.

Military service
Gentleman Cadet Montgomery-Cuninghame left the Royal Military College on 17 February 1897 and, following in his father’s footsteps, joining The Rifle Brigade (The Prince Consort's Own) as a second lieutenant. Although his father was already very ill, he accepted a 12-month posting to Singapore.

Upon his return he was quartered at Parkhurst Military Barracks, Isle of Wight.  While teaching the princes of Battenburg the art of signalling, he contracted scarlet fever resulting in the immediate departure of the princes, and a seal being placed on the gate of barracks while Montgomery-Cuninghame recovered.

Boer War: 1899–1902
The 1st Battalion Rifle Brigade was one of the first to be mobilised at the outbreak of the Boer War and, within a week, they were at war strength. From Parkhurst, they marched to Cowes, were ferried to Southampton and then by SS German to Cape Town. At the age of 20, Montgomery-Cuninghame was serving in the Boer War as a lieutenant with the 1st Battalion, Rifle Brigade. He was present at the relief of Ladysmith, including action at Colenso between 17 and 24 January 1900, where the Rifle Brigade lost 1,000 men. Between 5 and 7 February, he was in the action from the Brakfontein trenches during the advance on Vaal Krantz. The Rifle Brigade were supporting the 2nd Durham Light Infantry under heavy fire from the hill. At Vaal Krantz, the Rifles led the attack; Montgomery-Cuninghame was severely wounded in the leg from a bursting pom-pom shell.  This wound severed a vein or artery under his knee and was to alter the course of his military career.

He was twice mentioned in despatches In 1901, at the age of 23, Montgomery-Cuninghame was awarded the Distinguished Service Order

After treatment at Maritzburg and recuperation at Durban, he rejoined his colleagues after the battle at Ladysmith but, due to the residual damage from the injury, found he was unfit for marching any distance.  Consequently, he was offered a post as a Brigade Signalling Officer with the 4th Infantry Brigade. This period saw Montgomery-Cuninghame posted to Heidelberg, where Lord Herbert Kitchener directly entrusted him with a secret mission to the Queen of Swaziland who, subsequently named him Cibidela, meaning "He who puts things right between her & Lord Kitchener." He then had a posting at Barberton where one of his duties was to look after and train carrier pigeons.

Between armed conflict: 1902–1914
At the end of the war, Montgomery-Cuninghame was posted to Pretoria, working in intelligence.  However, he was evacuated unconscious to Chatham, having contracted enteric fever (typhoid fever). He remained at Chatham until 1906 when he returned to Sandhurst.  While riding through Bagshot, his horse bolted and he was thrown and fractured his skull.

In 1907, he was posted back to the 1st Rifle Brigade and Holywood, Belfast, Ireland. He remained in Ireland for five years. Thom’s Official Directory shows him as a Staff Captain, Curragh Camp, Kildare, Ireland in 1910 and the 1911 Irish Census shows him still in Kildare, living with his wife, son and daughter in Ballyfair (Ballysax, West Kildare), whereas other sources state he was the Deputy Assistant Quartermaster General, 5th Division Irish Cmd between 1909-1912. In the spring of 1912 he was posted to the 3rd Battalion Rifle Brigade at Tipperary, but he was not to remain there.

By the summer of 1912, he had taken over the position of Military Attaché from Major Eardly-Russell at Vienna, Austria and Cetinje, Albania. where he was based at the British Embassy in the Metternich Gasse.  There, he was tasked with gathering intelligence and reporting on the personal and political complications, intrigues and allegiances involving Austria, Germany, Bulgaria, Romania, Albania, Montenegro, Serbia, Hungary, Bosnia and Herzegovina and Russia.

First World War: 1914–1918
The outbreak of the war saw Montgomery-Cuninghame moved to Paris where he continued his intelligence role with the 1st Rifle Brigade, travelling to a number of countries.  Eager to leave intelligence and become an “ordinary soldier” again, he swapped roles with Major Christopher Thomson, 1st Baron Thomson and served with the 1st Corps at Hazebrouck under Sir Douglas Haig, 1st Earl Haig. However, his wish was not to be fulfilled and in February 1915, he travelled to London, where the War Office instructed him to leave at once for Athens with the express purpose of “helping the British Minister to get the Greeks on our side”.

Post-armistice: 1918–1924
At the end of World War I, Montgomery-Cuninghame returned to Vienna as Head of the British Military Mission. 1920 saw him leave Vienna for Prague on a military mission. Between 1920-1923 he was the Military Attaché to Vienna and Prague Colonel Montgomery-Cuninghame retired on retirement pay on 18 August 1924.

After his distinguished military career, he became the Director of European Motorways.

Montgomery-Cuninghame died 5 January 1945 in Willards Hill, Etchingham, Sussex and the funeral service took place at St. Mary’s Church, Salehurst, East Sussex. He is commemorated on a window in Kirkmichael Parish Church, Ayrshire.

Military awards
Distinguished Service Order (DSO)
King's South Africa Medal with Clasp awarded 1 November 1902
Legion of Honour Conferred by the President of the French Republic, Commandeur on 11 July 1919 
Distinguished Service Medal (U.S. Army) Conferred by the President of the United States of America on 12 July 1919 
The Croix de Guerre Conferred by the Government of the Czechoslovak Republic 29 March 1922 
Military Order of Maria Theresa Medal, Austria
Grand Cross Order of George I, Greece
Order of the Redeemer, Greece

References

Autobiography

Thomas Montgomery-Cuninghame, Dusty Measure. A Record of troubled Times, London, John Murray, 1936

Bibliography

Robert Hoffmann, The British Military Representative in Vienna, 1919. In: The Slavonic and East European Review, 52 (1974) 127, 252-271

Robert Hoffmann, Die Mission Sir Thomas Cuninghames in Wien 1919. Britische Österreichpolitik zur Zeit der Pariser Friedenskonferenz, PhD thesis, Salzburg 1971

1877 births
1945 deaths
Military personnel from London
Baronets in the Baronetage of Nova Scotia
People educated at Sandroyd School
People educated at Eton College
Graduates of the Royal Military College, Sandhurst
Companions of the Distinguished Service Order
Commandeurs of the Légion d'honneur
Montgomery-Cuninghame family